There are total 672 district courts in India. The complete list of District courts in India is as follows and there are 25 high courts in India

States

Andhra Pradesh (13)

 Anantapur
 Chittoor
 East Godavari (Rajahmundry)
 Guntur
 Krishna (Machilipatnam)
 Kurnool
 Prakasam
 Srikakulam
 Sri Potti Sriramulu (Nellore)
 Visakhapatnam
 Vizianagaram
 West Godavari (Eluru)
 YSR Kadapa

Arunachal Pradesh (16) 

 Anjaw
 Changlang
 Dibang Valley
 East Kameng
 East Siang
 Kurung Kumey
 Lohit
 Lower Dibang Valley
 Lower Subansiri
 Papum Pare
 Tawang
 Tirap
 Upper Siang
 Upper Subansiri
 West Kameng
 West Siang

Assam (27)

 Baksa
 Barpeta
 Bongaigaon
 Cachar
 Chirang
 Darrang
 Dhemaji
 Dhubri
 Dibrugarh
 Dima Hasao
 Goalpara
 Golaghat
 Hailakandi
 Jorhat
 Kamrup Metro
 Kamrup Amingaon
 Karimganj
 Karbi Anglong
 Kokrajhar
 Lakhimpur
 Morigaon
 Nagaon
 Nalbari
 Sivasagar
 Sonitpur
 Tinsukia
 Udalguri

Bihar (37) 

 Araria
 Aurangabad
 Banka
 Begusarai
 Bhagalpur
 Bhojpur
 Buxar
 Darbhanga
 East Champaran
 Gaya
 Gopalganj
 Jamui
 Jehanabad
 Kaimur (Bhabhua)
 Katihar
 Khagaria
 Kishanganj
 Lakhisarai
 Madhepura
 Madhubani
 Munger
 Muzaffarpur
 Nalanda
 Nawada
 Patna
 Purnea
 Rohtas (Sasaram Nagar)
 Saharsa
 Samastipur
 Saran
 Sheikhpura
 Sheohar
 Sitamarhi
 Siwan
 Supaul
 Vaishali
 West Champaran

Chhattisgarh (25)

 Balod
 Baloda Bazar
 Balrampur
 Bastar
 Bemetara
 Bijapur
 Bilaspur
 Dhamtari
 Durg
 Garibandh
 Janjgir-Champa
 Jashpur
 Kabirdham-Kawardha
 Kondagaon
 Korba
 Korea
 Mahasamund
 Mungeli
 North Bastar-Kanked
 Raigarh
 Raipur
 Rajnandgaon
 South Bastar-Dantewada
 Surajpur
 Surguja
  korba

Goa (2)

 North Goa
 South Goa

Gujarat (33) 

 Ahmedabad
 Amreli
 Anand
 Aravalli
 Banaskantha
 Bharuch
 Bhavnagar
 Botad
 Chhota Udepur
 Dahod
 Dang
 Devbhumi Dwarka
 Gandhinagar
 Gir Somnath
 Jamnagar
 Junagadh
 Kheda
 Kutch
 Mahisagar
 Mehsana
 Morbi
 Narmada
 Navsari
 Panchmahals
 Patan
 Porbandar
 Rajkot
 Sabarkantha
 Surat
 Surendranagar
 Tapi
 Vadodara
 Valsad

Haryana (21) 

 Ambala
 Bhiwani
 Faridabad
 Fatehabad
 Gurgaon
 Hisar
 Jhajjar
 Jind
 Kaithal
 Karnal
 Kurukshetra
 Mahendragarh
 Mewat
 Palwal
 Panchkula
 Panipat
 Rewari
 Rohtak
 Sirsa
 Sonipat
 Yamunanagar

Himachal Pradesh (11) 

 Bilaspur
 Chamba
 Hamirpur
 Kangra
 Kinnaur
 Kullu
 Mandi
 Shimla
 Sirmaur
 Solan
 Una

Jharkhand (24) 

 Bokaro
 Chatra
 Deoghar
 Dhanbad
 Dumka
 East Singhbhum
 Garhwa
 Giridih
 Godda
 Gumla
 Hazaribagh
 Jamtara
 Khunti
 Koderma
 Latehar
 Lohardaga
 Pakur
 Palamu
 Ramgarh
 Ranchi
 Sahibganj
 Seraikela-Kharsawan
 Simdega
 West Singhbhum

Karnataka (30) 

 Bagalkot
 Ballari
 Belagavi
 Bengaluru
 Bengaluru Rural
 Bidar
 Chamrajnagar
 Chikballapur
 Chikkamagaluru
 Chitradurga
 Dakshina Kannada
 Davangere
 Dharwad
 Gadag
 Hassan
 Haveri
 Kalaburagi
 Kodagu
 Kolar
 Koppal
 Mandya
 Mysuru
 Raichur
 Ramnagar
 Shivamogga
 Tumakuru
 Udupi
 Uttara Kannada
 Vijayapura
 Yadgir

Kerala (14) 

 Alappuzha
 Ernakulam
 Idukki
 Kannur
 Kasargod
 Kollam
 Kottayam
 Kozhikode
 Malappuram
 Palakkad
 Pathanamthitta
 Thiruvananthapuram
 Thrissur
 Wayanad

Madhya Pradesh (50)

 Alirajpur
 Anuppur
 Ashoknagar
 Balaghat
 Barwani
 Betul
 Bhind
 Bhopal
 Burhanpur
 Chhatarpur
 Chhindwara
 Damoh
 Datia
 Dewas
 Dhar
 Dindori
 Guna
 Gwalior
 Harda
 Hoshangabad
 Indore
 Jabalpur
 Jhabua
 Katni
 Khandwa
 Khargone
 Mandla
 Mandsaur
 Morena
 Narsinghpur
 Neemuch
 Panna
 Raisen
 Rajgarh
 Ratlam
 Rewa
 Sagar
 Satna
 Sehore
 Seoni
 Shahdol
 Shajapur
 Sheopur
 Shivpuri
 Sidhi
 Singrauli
 Tikamgarh
 Ujjain
 Umaria
 Vidisha

Maharashtra (39)

 Ahmadnagar
 Akola
 Amravati
 Aurangabad
 Beed
 Bhandara
 Buldhana
 Chandrapur
 Dhule
 Gadchiroli
 Gondia
 Jalgaon
 Jalna
 Kolhapur
 Latur
 Maharashtra CoOperative Courts
 Maharashtra Family Courts
 Maharashtra Industrial/Labour Courts
 Mumbai City Civil Court
 Mumbai CMM Court
 Mumbai Motor/Accident Claims Tribunal
 Mumbai Small Cause Court
 Nagpur
 Nanded
 Nandurbar
 Nashik
 Osmanabad
 Parbhani
 Pune
 Raigad
 Ratnagiri
 Sangli
 Satara
 Sindhudurg
 Solapur
 Thane
 Wardha
 Washim
 Yavatmal
Mumbai

Manipur (7) 

 Bishnupur
 Churachandpur
 Imphal East
 Imphal West
 Senapati
 Thoubal
 Ukhrul

Meghalaya (7) 

 East Garo Hills
 East Khasi Hills
 Jaintia Hills
 Ri-Bhoi
 South West Garo Hills
 West Garo Hills
 West Khasi Hills

Mizoram (8) 

 Aizawl
 Champhai
 Kolasib
 Lawngtlai
 Lunglei
 Mamit
 Saiha
 Serchhip

Nagaland (11) 

 Dimapur
 Kohima
 Kiphire
 Longleng
 Mokokchung
 Mon
 Peren
 Phek
 Tuensang
 Wokha
 Zunheboto

Odisha (30)

 Angul
 Balangir
 Balasore
 Bargarh
 Bhadrak
 Boudh
 Cuttack
 Deogarh
 Dhenkanal
 Gajapati
 Ganjam
 Jagatsinghapur
 Jajpur
 Jharsuguda
 Kalahandi
 Kandhamal
 Kendrapara
 Kendujhar
 Khordha
 Koraput
 Malkangiri
 Mayurbhanj
 Nabarangpur
 Nayagarh
 Nuapada
 Puri
 Rayagada
 Sambalpur
 Subarnapur
 Sundargarh

Punjab (22) 

 Amritsar
 Barnala
 Bathinda
 Faridkot
 Fatehgarh Sahib
 Fazilka
 Ferozepur
 Gurdaspur
 Hoshiarpur
 Jalandhar
 Kapurthala
 Ludhiana
 Mansa
 Moga
 Muktsar
 Nawanshahr
 Pathankot
 Patiala
 Rupnagar
 Sangrur
 SAS Nagar
 Tarn Taran

Rajasthan (33) 

 Ajmer
 Alwar
 Banswara
 Baran
 Barmer
 Bharatpur
 Bhilwara
 Bikaner
 Bundi
 Chittorgarh
 Churu
 Dausa
 Dholpur
 Dungarpur
 Hanumangarh
 Jaipur
 Jaisalmer
 Jalor
 Jhalawar
 Jhunjhunu
 Jodhpur
 Karauli
 Kota
 Nagaur
 Pali
 Pratapgarh
 Rajsamand
 Sawai Madhopur
 Sikar
 Sirohi
 Sri Ganganagar
 Tonk
 Udaipur

Sikkim (4) 

 East Sikkim
 North Sikkim
 South Sikkim
 West Sikkim

Tamil Nadu (32) 

 Ariyalur
 Chennai
 Coimbatore
 Cuddalore
 Dharmapuri
 Dindigul
 Erode
 Kanchipuram
 Kanyakumari
 Karur
 Krishnagiri
 Madurai
 Nagapattinam
 Namakkal
 Perambalur
 Pudukottai
 Ramanathapuram
 Salem
 Sivaganga
 Thanjavur
 The Nilgiris
 Theni
 District Courts
 Tiruchirappalli
 Tirunelveni
 Tiruppur
 Tiruvallur
 Tiruvannamalai
 Tiruvarur
 Vellore
 Villuppuram
 Virudhunagar

Telangana (12) 

 Adilabad
 Hyderabad- City Civil Court
 Hyderabad- City Small Cause Court
 Hyderabad- Metropolitan Sessions Court
 Karimnagar
 Khammam
 Mahabubnagar
 Medak
 Nalgonda 
 Nizamabad
 Ranga Reddy 
 Warangal

Tripura (8) 

 Dhalai
 Gomati
 Khowai
 North Tripura
 Sepahijala
 South Tripura
 Unakoti
 West Tripura

Uttar Pradesh (75)

 Agra
 Aligarh
 Allahabad
 Ambedkar Nagar
 Amethi
 Amroha
 Auraiya
 Azamgarh
 Baghpat
 Bahraich
 Ballia
 Balrampur
 Banda
 Barabanki
 Bareilly
 Basti
 Bhadohi
 Bijnor
 Budaun
 Bulandshahar
 Chandauli
 Chitrakoot
 Deoria
 Etah
 Etawah
 Faizabad
 Farrukhabad
 Fatehpur
 Firozabad
 Gautam Budh Nagar
 Ghaziabad
 Ghazipur
 Gonda
 Gorakhpur
 Hamirpur
 Hapur
 Hardoi
 Hathras
 Jalaun
 Jaunpur
 Jhansi
 Kannauj
 Kanpur Dehat
 Kanpur Nagar
 Kasganj
 Kaushambi
 Kushinagar
 Lakhimpur Kheri
 Lalitpur
 Lucknow
 Maharajganj
 Mahoba
 Mainpuri
 Mathura
 Mau
 Meerut
 Mirzapur
 Moradabad
 Muzaffarnagar
 Pilibhit
 Pratapgarh
 Raebareli
 Rampur
 Saharanpur
 Sambhal
 Sant Kabir Nagar
 Shahjahanpur
 Shamli
 Shravasti
 Siddhartha Nagar
 Sitapur
 Sonbhadra
 Sultanpur
 Unnao
 Varanasi

Uttarakhand (13) 

 Almora
 Bageshwar
 Chamoli
 Champawat
 Dehradun
 Haridwar
 Nainital
 Pauri Garhwal
 Pithoragarh
 Rudraprayag
 Tehri Garhwal
 Udham Singh Nagar
 Uttarkashi

West Bengal (23)

 Bankura
 Birbhum
 Cooch Behar
 Darjeeling
 East Bardhaman
 East Medinipur
 Hooghly
 Howrah
 Jalpaiguri
 Kalimpong
 Kolkata-City Civil Court
 Kolkata-City Sessions Court
 Kolkata-Presidency Small Causes Court
 Malda
 Murshidabad
 Nadia
 North 24 Parganas
 North Dinajpur
 Purulia
 South 24 Parganas
 South Dinajpur
 West Bardhaman
 West Medinipur

Union territories

Andaman and Nicobar Islands (3) 

 Nicobar
 North and Middle Andaman
 South Andaman

Chandigarh (1) 

 Chandigarh

Dadra and Nagar Haveli and Daman and Diu (3) 

 Dadra and Nagar Haveli
 Daman
 Diu

Delhi (11) 

 Central Delhi
 East Delhi
 New Delhi
 North Delhi
 North East Delhi
 North West Delhi
 Shahdara Delhi
 South Delhi
 South East Delhi
 South West Delhi
 West Delhi

Jammu and Kashmir (20) 

 Anantnag
 Badgam
 Bandipora
 Baramula
 Doda
 Ganderbal
 Jammu
 Kathua
 Kishtwar
 Kulgam
 Kupwara
 Poonch
 Pulwama
 Rajouri
 Ramban
 Reasi
 Samba
 Shopian
 Srinagar
 Udhampur

Ladakh (2) 

 Leh
 Kargil

Lakshadweep (1) 

 Lakshadweep

Puducherry (4) 

 Karaikal
 Mahe
 Pondicherry
 Yanam

References

External links
 District Court websites
 District Courts of India

District Courts of India
District Courts